Egersund Station is a railway station located in the town of Egersund in Eigersund municipality in Rogaland county, Norway. It is served by regional trains between Stavanger and Kristiansand as well as being the terminus of the Jæren Commuter Rail to Stavanger.

History
The station is from 1944 when Jæren Line was connected to the Sørlandet Line, and converted to standard gauge. Prior to this the old station in Egersund, the terminal station of Jæren Line, was located about one kilometer away.

References

Railway stations on the Sørlandet Line
Railway stations in Rogaland
Railway stations opened in 1878
1878 establishments in Norway
Eigersund